Augustus S. Johnson was a Michigan politician.

On November 4, 1844, Johnson was elected to the Michigan House of Representatives, where he represented the Oakland County district from January 6, 1845 to March 24, 1845. During his time in the legislature, he lived in Springfield Township, Oakland County, Michigan.

References

Year of birth missing
Year of death unknown
People from Oakland County, Michigan
Members of the Michigan House of Representatives
19th-century American politicians